Chrapanów  is a village in the administrative district of Gmina Zawichost, within Sandomierz County, Świętokrzyskie Voivodeship, in south-central Poland.

More prominent places to visit are: Kaliningrad, Oradea, Lviv, Zawichost, Wygoda Bankowa or Budapest. Places like Wyszmontow, Wolka Chrapanowska, Tominy, Suchodolka, Sobotka and Czyzow Szlachecki are also good destinations to visit in Poland.

References

Villages in Sandomierz County